"Get Shaky" is a song by American DJ and producer Ian Carey. It was first released as a commercial radio track in Australia by Vicious Recordings who made it peak at number two on the ARIA Singles Chart. It then went on peak within the top ten of the charts in Belgium, New Zealand, and the United Kingdom, and the goal song of world champions Czech Republic at the 2010 Ice Hockey World Championships in Germany. The song features on Clubland 16 and also on Clubland: Smashed. The female voice is American singer-songwriter Kelly Barnes, who also co-wrote the song.

Track listing
Australian CD single
 "Get Shaky" (radio edit) – 2:58
 "Get Shaky" (Ian Carey Original vs Alternative Remix) – 6:02
 "Get Shaky" (Vandalism Remix)
 "Get Shaky" (Stonebridge Remix)

Charts

Weekly charts

Year-end charts

Decade-end charts

Certifications and sales

References

2008 singles
Ian Carey songs
2008 songs
Songs written by Alexander Perls